Burnaby-Lougheed is a provincial electoral district in British Columbia, Canada established by the Electoral Districts Act, 2008.  It was first contested in the 2009 general election in which Liberal, Harry Bloy was elected MLA.

MLAs

Election results

References

British Columbia provincial electoral districts
Politics of Burnaby
Provincial electoral districts in Greater Vancouver and the Fraser Valley